Amy Kleinhans-Curd (born 1968) is a South African beauty queen who was Miss South Africa 1992, the first non-white winner in the history of South Africa. She placed Top 5 to Miss World as Miss World Africa on 12 December 1992.

Miss South Africa
As a 23-year-old Cape Coloured woman, she competed for the first time in 1991 and placed second. She competed the following year and defeated 11 other contestants for the title of Miss South Africa 1992, the first time ever a non-white woman was crowned in the history of Miss South Africa.

Her first runner-up was also non-white, black woman Augustine Masilela of Soweto, who would be a Top 10 semifinalist at Miss Universe 1995.

Kleinhans would crown her successor a year later, Palesa Jacqui Mofokeng, who would be the first black Miss South Africa ever and second non-white to capture the crown.

In 2014, she was guest judge in the final Miss South Africa 2014 beauty pageant, venue in the Sun City Superbowl, Rustenburg, South Africa. Transmitted by television network DStv.

Miss World 1992
As the official representative of her country to the 1992 Miss World pageant held in Sun City, South Africa on 12 December, she became Miss World Africa and 4th runner-up to eventual winner Julia Kourotchkina of Russia.

During the pageant participants paraded with the flag of their country.  Amy refused to walk with the flag of then apartheid South Africa.  She chose instead to walk with a white flag, symbolising peace. After the event she received a phone call from Nelson Mandela thanking her for making that decision.  

The dress she wore while participating in the pageant, a white and gold Stefania Morland design with elaborate ostrich feather details, is on exhibition at the CP Nel Museum in Oudtshoorn.

Personal life
Amy Kleinhans is married to New Zealand businessman Leighton Curd, and is the mother of four children.

References

Living people
1968 births
Coloured South African people
Miss World 1992 delegates
Miss South Africa winners